Carlos Sherman (October 25, 1934 – March 4, 2005) was a Uruguay-born Belarusian–Spanish translator, writer, human rights activist and honorary vice-president of the Belarusian PEN Center (a worldwide association of writers, aimed to promote intellectual cooperation and understanding among writers). He translated from Spanish into Belarusian and Russian.

Biography
Carlos was born in Montevideo, Uruguay. His father was from western Belarus, and his mother was a Native American. He grew up in Argentina, and studied philology at Universidad de Morón in Buenos Aires from 1951 to 1956, and started his writing career there. He became a friend of Pablo Neruda. In 1955, he became editor in chief of the newspaper 'Mi Pueblo'.  In 1956, influenced by Soviet propaganda, his father decided to return to Belarus (then the Belarusian Soviet Socialist Republic, part of the USSR), taking the whole family. At first, Carlos worked there in a factory, and then as a translator and librarian (chief of the publishing operations of the Jakub Kolas library of the Academy of Sciences of Belarus), and from 1980 onwards, devoting himself exclusively to literary work.  He has translated into Spanish the work of several leading Belarusian prose writers and poets (such as Jakub Kolas, Janka Kupala, Ryhor Baradulin, Vasil Bykau) and into Belarusian and Russian the works of García Lorca, Neruda, and many others, while continuing to write his own poetry in Spanish. In the late 1980s, he launched a campaign to establish a Belarusian Centre of the International PEN organization, and, once it was established, served as its vice-president until 2002 or 2003, when he was forced to retire due to ill health.

He died in a hospital in Norway at the age of 71.

External links
 Belarusian PEN Centre
 A verse from Carlos Sherman in "Mindfire"

1934 births
2005 deaths
Uruguayan translators
Belarusian translators
Translators from Belarusian
Translators from Spanish
Translators to Russian
Translators to Belarusian
Translators to Spanish
Belarusian writers
Uruguayan expatriates in Argentina
Uruguayan people of Belarusian descent
Uruguayan people of indigenous peoples descent
20th-century translators
20th-century Uruguayan male writers